Addams/Medill Park is a public park in Chicago named after Jane Addams and  Medill Elementary School. It is located in Little Italy.

Recent history
In June  2017 it was announced that Exelon planned to build a $20 million, 100,000 sq-ft multi-purpose indoor facility in the park, it opened in late winter 2019 under the name Comed Rec Centre. It is expected to receive 100,000 annual customer. The park will also undergo $5 million of outdoor renovations.

Events
Every year, Addams/Medill Park hosts Ruido Fest and formerly hosted Spring Awakening until it moved to Hoffman Estates in 2019.

References

External links
Jane Addams Park at the Chicago Park District

Parks in Chicago